Fitz Lee (June 1866 – September 14, 1899) was a Buffalo Soldier in the United States Army and a recipient of America's highest military decoration—the Medal of Honor—for his actions at the Battle of Tayacoba in the Spanish–American War.  Lee and three of his fellow Buffalo Soldiers were the last black servicemen to be presented the Medal of Honor for more than half a century.

Biography
Lee joined the Army from Philadelphia, Pennsylvania in December 1889, and by June 30, 1898, he was serving as a private in Troop M of the 10th Cavalry Regiment. On that day, American forces aboard the Florida near Trinidad, Cuba, dispatched a landing party to provide reconnaissance on Spanish outposts in the area. The party was discovered by Spanish scouts and came under heavy fire; their boats were sunk by enemy cannon fire, leaving them stranded on shore.

The men aboard the Florida launched several rescue attempts; the first four were forced to retreat under heavy fire. The fifth attempt, by Lee and three other privates of the 10th Cavalry (Dennis Bell, William H. Thompkins and George H. Wanton) under the command of Lieutenant Ahern, was launched at night and successfully found and rescued the surviving members of the landing party. One year later, on June 23, 1899, four of the rescuers were awarded the Medal of Honor for their actions in what had come to be known as the Battle of Tayacoba.

Fitz Lee died less than three months after receiving the medal. He was buried in Fort Leavenworth National Cemetery, Leavenworth County, Kansas.

Medal of Honor citation
Private Lee's official Medal of Honor citation reads:
After a force had succeeded in landing and had been compelled to withdraw to the boats, leaving a number of killed and wounded ashore, he voluntarily went ashore in the face of the enemy and aided in the rescue of his wounded comrades who would otherwise have fallen into the hands of the enemy, this after several previous attempts had been frustrated.

See also

List of Medal of Honor recipients for the Spanish–American War
List of African American Medal of Honor recipients

References

External links

 

1866 births
1899 deaths
United States Army Medal of Honor recipients
American military personnel of the Spanish–American War
United States Army soldiers
Burials in Kansas
Buffalo Soldiers
People from Dinwiddie County, Virginia
Spanish–American War recipients of the Medal of Honor
Military personnel from Virginia